The Canton of Mirambeau is a former canton of the Charente-Maritime département, in France. It was disbanded following the French canton reorganisation which came into effect in March 2015. It had 7,815 inhabitants (2012). The lowest point is the Atlantic Ocean at the commune of Saint-Sorlin-de-Conac, the highest point is at Salignac-de-Mirambeau at 111 m, the average or the centre is 46 m.  The most populated commune was Mirambeau with 1,491 inhabitants (2012).

Communes of Mirambeau

The canton comprised the following communes:

Allas-Bocage
Boisredon
Consac
Courpignac
Mirambeau
Nieul-le-Virouil
Saint-Bonnet-sur-Gironde
Saint-Ciers-du-Taillon
Saint-Dizant-du-Bois
Saint-Georges-des-Agoûts
Saint-Hilaire-du-Bois
Saint-Martial-de-Mirambeau
Sainte-Ramée
Saint-Sorlin-de-Conac 
Saint-Thomas-de-Conac
Salignac-de-Mirambeau
Semillac
Semoussac
Soubran

Population history

See also 
 Cantons of the Charente-Maritime department

References

Mirambeau
2015 disestablishments in France
States and territories disestablished in 2015